Bang Bang is a sub-prefecture of Guéra Region in Chad.

Demographics 
Ethnic composition by canton in 2016:

Dangueléat Est Canton (population: 38,125; villages: 15):

Dangueléat Ouest Canton (population: 26,462; villages: 8):

References 

Populated places in Chad